Indian Hills is an unincorporated town, a post office, and a census-designated place (CDP) located in and governed by Jefferson County, Colorado, United States. The CDP is a part of the Denver–Aurora–Lakewood, CO Metropolitan Statistical Area. The Indian Hills post office has the ZIP code 80454. At the United States Census 2010, the population of the Indian Hills CDP was 1,280, while the population of the 80454 ZIP Code Tabulation Area was 1,224.

History
John D. Parmalee (1813–1885) came to Colorado in 1860 and settled in Mount Vernon. In 1866, he was granted a charter for a toll road between Morrison and Bradford Junction (Conifer); the Denver and Turkey Creek Toll Road 
opened in 1870. Parmalee also operated sawmills and shingle mills in the area. He was later commissioned to build a road from Turkey Creek to Bergen Park, along what is known as Parmalee Gulch.

In 1885, Parmalee sold his interest in the toll road to Benjamin F. Eden (1848–1932), who became tollgate keeper from 1877 to 1883. In 1886, Eden sold the road to Jefferson County. Eden bought properties in the northern end of Parmalee Gulch, which became known as Eden Park. With the Panic of 1893 and crash in silver prices, the development foundered and Eden recovered the property. He continued to farm the area, raising cattle, horses, hay, and potatoes.

George W. Olinger, son of mortuary founders John and Emma Olinger, became interested in the area in 1918, and purchased the Eden property in 1921. Olinger planned a development to be called "Indian Hills," and built a golf course on part of Eden's land.  The first filing was recorded at Jefferson County in June 1923, making Indian Hills the community's official name. Filings were named to recall the association with original inhabitants: Arrowhead Park, Ute & Cherokee Village, and Shawnee Village.  "Eden Park" became the fifth filing of Olinger's development, and was platted in 1926. Models of summer cabins were built of logs, and small lots were sold to Denver residents seeking summer homes in the mountains.

Geography
Indian Hills extends along the Parmalee Gulch and Myers Gulch Roads between State Highway 74 at Kittredge, Colorado, and U.S. Highway 285 at Turkey Creek.

Demographics

Education
Indian Hills is served by the Jefferson County Public Schools. Schools serving Indian Hills include:
Parmalee Elementary School
West Jefferson Middle School
Conifer High School

Humorous sign
The sign at the Indian Hills Community Center features a changing display of humorous wordplays, and has its own Facebook page.

See also

Outline of Colorado
Index of Colorado-related articles
State of Colorado
Colorado cities and towns
Colorado census designated places
Colorado counties
Jefferson County, Colorado
List of statistical areas in Colorado
Front Range Urban Corridor
North Central Colorado Urban Area
Denver-Aurora-Boulder, CO Combined Statistical Area
Denver-Aurora-Broomfield, CO Metropolitan Statistical Area

References

External links

Indian Hills Improvement Association
History of Indian Hills
The Indian Hills Community Center and Sign
Indian Hills Fire Protection District
Indian Hills Water District
Jefferson County website

Census-designated places in Jefferson County, Colorado
Census-designated places in Colorado
Denver metropolitan area